Guntars Silagailis (born 31 August 1984) is a Latvian professional football coach and former player, currently managing Rēzeknes BJSS in the Latvian First League. He played as a striker.

Career

Early career
In the early part of his career he played for numerous clubs in Latvia including his hometown club FK Rezekne and top Latvian side FK Ventspils. Following a short period with FK Riga Silagailis was on his way out of the country.

Cork City
Silagailis signed for Cork City in February 2009 and had an immediate impact on the team. He scored away against Derry on 20 March 2009 however the Rebel Army ended up losing 2–1. He scored a brace the week after in a 2–1 victory over Bray Wanderers at Turner's Cross.

However his stay in Ireland and was blighted by injury and he failed to make a sustained impression at the club and was out of the first team for large periods of the season. His only other goal for the club in the FAI Cup in June away to Sligo Rovers but City were knocked out 2–1. He left the club after his season-long contract was not renewed.

Belarus
After his brief spell in Western Europe he went to the other side of the continent and joined FC Vitebsk from Belarus in February 2010. He played only a few matches there and didn't manage to score a single goal. After only 6 months with the club he decided to break his contract with the club as its financial situation was getting worse. Since August 2010 Silagailis had a free agent's status and was looking for a new club.

Return to Latvia
Only a week after he had been released from the Belarus side, he found a new club. This time he returned to the club, where he had started his playing career - SK Blāzma. He finished the season with 5 goals in 10 appearances.

Israel
In January 2011 he left SK Blāzma, signing for Liga Leumit club Ahva Arraba. He scored 3 goals in 16 games for the Israeli club and left on 1 August 2011.

Welcome home again
In August 2011 Silagailis signed a contract with the Latvian Higher League newcomers FC Jūrmala. He played 8 league matches for them, without scoring goals. Before the 2012 Latvian Higher League season Silagailis went on trial with last year's bronze medalists Daugava Daugavpils and signed a contract with them in March 2012. He spent two seasons with Daugava being in times played as a forward and a left-back. With 2 goals in 43 league appearances and UEFA Champions League experience under his belt Silagailis left Daugava in March 2014 to join his home-town club Rēzeknes BJSS playing in the Latvian First League. With 41 goals scored in a single season Silagailis became the top scorer of the 2014 Latvian First League season and helped his club finish the championship as the runners-up.

Honours

 Latvian Higher League champion - 2006, 2012
 Latvian Supercup winner - 2013
 Latvian First League top scorer - 2014

References

External links
 
 

1984 births
Living people
People from Rēzekne
Latvian footballers
Association football forwards
Latvian expatriate footballers
League of Ireland players
Liga Leumit players
SK Blāzma players
FK Ventspils players
FK Rīga players
FC Jūrmala players
Cork City F.C. players
FC Vitebsk players
Ahva Arraba F.C. players
FC Daugava players
Expatriate association footballers in the Republic of Ireland
Expatriate footballers in Belarus
Expatriate footballers in Israel
Latvian expatriate sportspeople in Belarus
Latvian expatriate sportspeople in Israel
Latvian football managers